"Always" is a song by American contemporary Christian musicians Chris Tomlin. It was released on March 29, 2022, as the lead single from Tomlin's fourteenth studio album, Always (2022). Tomlin co-wrote the song with Ben Glover, Daniel Carson, Jeff Sojka, and Jess Cates. Ben Glover and Jeff Sojka handled the production of the single.

"Always" peaked at No. 6 on the US Hot Christian Songs chart published by Billboard.

Background
On March 29, 2022, Chris Tomlin released a two-track single titled Always, containing the title track and "Yahweh (No One)" with Elevation Worship, accompanied with their lyric videos.

Composition

Commercial performance
"Always" debuted at No. 34 on the US Hot Christian Songs chart dated April 16, 2022. It went on to peak at No. 6 on the Hot Christian Songs chart.

"Always" debuted at No. 45 on the US Christian Airplay chart dated April 30, 2022. It went on to reach No. 5 on the Christian Airplay chart.

Music videos
The official lyric video of "Always" was published via Chris Tomlin's YouTube channel on March 29, 2022. On April 12, 2022, Tomlin released the acoustiv performance video of the song through YouTube. The live performance video of "Always" filmed at Good Friday Nashville, was issued on April 22, 2022.

Track listing

Personnel
Adapted from AllMusic.

 Adam Ayan — mastering engineer
 Jonsal Barrientes — choir/chorus
 Dallan Beck — editing
 Chris Brown — background vocals, choir/chorus
 Shantay Brown — choir/chorus
 Daniel Carson — acoustic guitar, choir/chorus, electric guitar
 Tamera Chipp — choir/chorus
 Chad Chrisman — A&R
 Elevation Worship — primary artist
 Enaka Enyong — choir/chorus
 Sam Gibson — mixing
 Ben Glover — acoustic guitar, background vocals, choir/chorus, electric guitar, engineer, keyboards, producer, programming
 Lindsay Glover — choir/chorus
 Tarik Henry — choir/chorus
 Mark Hill — bass
 Tiffany Hudson — choir/chorus
 Tommy Iceland — choir/chorus
 Graham King — engineer
 Benji Kurokose — choir/chorus
 Jerry McPherson — electric guitar
 Gordon Mote — piano
 Brad O'Donnell — A&R
 Sophie Shear — choir/chorus
 Jeff Sojka — background vocals, choir/chorus, drums, electric guitar, engineer, keyboards, producer, programming
 Isaiah Templeton — choir/chorus
 Chris Tomlin — choir/chorus, primary artist
 Bria Valderrama — choir/chorus
 Doug Weier — mixing
 Jordan Welch — choir/chorus

Charts

Weekly charts

Year-end charts

Release history

References

External links
  on PraiseCharts

 

2022 singles
2022 songs
Chris Tomlin songs